Flue gas is the gas exiting to the atmosphere via a flue, which is a pipe or channel for conveying exhaust gases from a fireplace, oven, furnace, boiler or steam generator. Quite often, the flue gas refers to the combustion exhaust gas produced at power plants. Its composition depends on what is being burned, but it will usually consist of mostly nitrogen (typically more than two-thirds) derived from the combustion of air, carbon dioxide, and water vapor as well as excess oxygen (also derived from the combustion air). It further contains a small percentage of a number of pollutants, such as particulate matter (like soot), carbon monoxide, nitrogen oxides, and sulfur oxides.

Most fossil fuels are combusted with ambient air (as differentiated from combustion with pure oxygen). Since ambient air contains about 79 volume percent gaseous nitrogen (N2), which is essentially non-combustible, the largest part of the flue gas from most fossil-fuel combustion is uncombusted nitrogen. Carbon dioxide (CO2), the next largest part of flue gas, can be as much as 10−25 volume percent or more of the flue gas. This is closely followed in volume by water vapor (H2O) created by the combustion of the hydrogen in the fuel with atmospheric oxygen. Much of the 'smoke' seen pouring from flue gas stacks is this water vapor forming a cloud as it contacts cool air.

A typical flue gas from the combustion of fossil fuels contains very small amounts of nitrogen oxides, sulfur dioxide (SO2) and particulate matter. The nitrogen oxides are derived from the nitrogen in the ambient air as well as from any nitrogen-containing compounds in the fossil fuel. The sulfur dioxide is derived from any sulfur-containing compounds in the fuels. The particulate matter is composed of very small particles of solid materials and very small liquid droplets which give flue gases their smoky appearance.

The steam generators in large power plants and the process furnaces in large refineries, petrochemical and chemical plants, and incinerators burn considerable amounts of fossil fuels and therefore emit large amounts of flue gas to the ambient atmosphere. The table below presents the total amounts of flue gas typically generated by the burning of fossil fuels such as natural gas, fuel oil and coal. The data were obtained by stoichiometric calculations.

The total amount of wet flue gas generated by coal combustion is only 10 percent higher than the flue gas generated by natural-gas combustion (the ratio for dry flue gas is higher).

Scrubbing

At power plants, flue gas is often treated with a series of chemical processes and scrubbers, which remove pollutants. Electrostatic precipitators or fabric filters remove particulate matter and flue-gas desulfurization captures the sulfur dioxide produced by burning fossil fuels, particularly coal. Nitrogen oxides are treated either by modifications to the combustion process to prevent their formation, or by high temperature or catalytic reaction with ammonia or urea. In either case, the aim is to produce nitrogen gas, rather than nitrogen oxides. In the United States, there is a rapid deployment of technologies to remove mercury from flue gas—typically by absorption on sorbents or by capture in inert solids as part of the flue-gas desulfurization product. Such scrubbing can lead to meaningful recovery of sulfur for further industrial use.

They are now under active research as a method for  capture for long-term storage as a means of greenhouse gas remediation, and have begun to be implemented in a limited way commercially (e.g. the Sleipner West field in the North Sea, operating since 1996).

There are a number of proven technologies for removing pollutants emitted from power plants that are now available. There is also much ongoing research into technologies that will remove even more air pollutants.

Composition of flue-gas emissions from fossil-fuel combustion 

 m3 are standard cubic meters at 0 °C and 101.325 kPa, and scf is standard cubic feet at 60 °F and 14.696 psia.

See also
AP 42 Compilation of Air Pollutant Emission Factors
Carbon capture and storage
Emission standard
Exhaust gas
Flue gas stacks
Flue gas to fuel
Flue-gas desulfurization
Integrated gasification combined cycle (often referred to as IGCC)
Landfill gas

References

Air pollution
Combustion
Environmental engineering
Industrial gases